This is a list of cases decided by the Supreme Court of the Republic of Texas.

1840 
Republic v. McCullough, Dallam 357 (1840).
Hunter v. Oelrich, Dallam 358 (1840).
Dangerfield v. Secretary of State, Dallam 358 (1840).
Edwards v. Peoples, Dallam 359 (1840).
Board of Land Com'rs v. Weede, Dallam 361 (1840).
Goode v. Cheshire, Dallam 362 (1840).
Yeamans v. Tone, Dallam 362 (1840).
Winfield v. Yates, Dallam 363 (1840).
Soy's Estate v. McMullen, Dallam 363 (1840).
Patton v. Robert Mills & Co., Dallam 364 (1840).
Board of Land Com'rs v. Bell, Dallam 366 (1840).
Harvey v. Patterson, Dallam 369 (1840).
Mann v. Thruston, Dallam 370 (1840).
Allen v. Ward, Dallam 371 (1840).
Whiteman v. Garrett, Dallam 374 (1840).
Republic v. Mumford, Dallam 374 (1840).
Andrews v. Andrews, Dallam 375 (1840).
Republic v. Bynum, Dallam 376 (1840).

1841 
Bailey v. Haddy, Dallam 376 (1841).
Stafford v. Perker, Dallam 380 (1841).
Board of Land Com'rs v. Reily, Dallam 381 (1841).
Weede v. Board of Land Com'rs, Dallam 386 (1841).
Raquet v. Nixon, Dallam 386 (1841).
Cartwright v. Roberts, Dallam 389 (1841).
Reece v. Smith, Dallam 390 (1841).
Grayson v. Cummins, Dallam 391 (1841).
Guest v. Guest, Dallam 394 (1841).
Board of Land Com'rs v. Herring, Dallam 395 (1841).
Morton v. Gordon, Dallam 396 (1841).
Fowler v. Poor, Dallam 401 (1841).
Cayce v. Curtis, Dallam 403 (1841).
Cayce v. Horton, Dallam 405 (1841).
Ex parte De Bland, Dallam 406 (1841).
Republic v. Smith, Dallam 407 (1841).
Republic v. Laughlin, Dallam 412 (1841).
Rice v. Powell, Dallam 413 (1841).
Mills v. Waller, Dallam 416 (1841).
Hill v. M'Dermot, Dallam 419 (1841).
Knight v. Huff, Dallam 425 (1841).
Andrews v. Andrews, Dallam 427 (1841).
O'Connor v. Van Homme, Dallam 429 (1841).
Hall v. Allcorn, Dallam 433 (1841).
Austin v. W.C. White & Co., Dallam 434 (1841).
Hall v. Phelps, Dallam 435 (1841).
McKinney v. Bradbury, Dallam 441 (1841).
Austin v. Sawyer, Dallam 445 (1841).
Austin v. Andrews, Dallam 447 (1841).
Hirams v. Coit, Dallam 449 (1841).

1844 
Herbert v. Moore, Dallam 592 (1844).  Determined that Indians were not sovereign nations, the rule of postliminy did not apply to property taken by Indians.
Republic v. Inglish, Dallam 608 (1844).  To obtain a land grant, it must be authorized under either the national constitution or laws, or the laws of the Mexican government prior to independence.
Saddler v. Republic, Dallam 610 (1844).  Although it takes more than one to be in an affray, a conviction against one will stand even if the others are acquitted.
Binge v. Smith, Dallam 616 (1844).  Dealing with permissive joinder of a lawsuit.

Legal history of Texas
Supreme Court of the Republic of Texas cases
Republic of Texas law